Anne Meygret (born 15 February 1965) is a French fencer. She won a bronze medal in the women's team foil at the 1984 Summer Olympics.

References

External links
 

1965 births
Living people
Sportspeople from Nice
French female foil fencers
Olympic fencers of France
Fencers at the 1984 Summer Olympics
Olympic bronze medalists for France
Olympic medalists in fencing
Medalists at the 1984 Summer Olympics
20th-century French women